Lawrence is a village in Van Buren County in the U.S. state of Michigan. The population was 996 at the 2010 census. The village is located within Lawrence Township. It is host to an annual Ox Roast, Homecoming festival, and Farmer's Market.

Geography

Demographics

2010 census
As of the census of 2010, there were 996 people, 371 households, and 251 families living in the village. The racial makeup of the village was 79.4% White, 1.4% African American, 0.6% Native American, 0.1% Asian, 15.6% from other races, and 2.9% from two or more races. Hispanic or Latino of any race were 27.2% of the population.

There were 371 households, of which 41.8% had children under the age of 18 living with them, 42.6% were married couples living together, 16.7% had a female householder with no husband present, 8.4% had a male householder with no wife present, and 32.3% were non-families. 29.1% of all households were made up of individuals, and 10.2% had someone living alone who was 65 years of age or older. The average household size was 2.65 and the average family size was 3.25.

The median age in the village was 31.7 years. 32% of residents were under the age of 18; 8.6% were between the ages of 18 and 24; 27.8% were from 25 to 44; 22.1% were from 45 to 64; and 9.1% were 65 years of age or older. The gender makeup of the village was 50.5% male and 49.5% female.

2000 census
As of the census of 2000, there were 1,059 people, 392 households, and 268 families living in the village. The racial makeup of the village was 79.32% White, 3.78% African American, 1.51% Native American, 0.85% Asian, 9.54% from other races, and 5.00% from two or more races. Hispanic or Latino of any race were 18.32% of the population.

There were 392 households, out of which 38.3% had children under the age of 18 living with them, 48.7% were married couples living together, 15.8% had a female householder with no husband present, and 31.4% were non-families. 28.3% of all households were made up of individuals, and 13.8% had someone living alone who was 65 years of age or older.  The average household size was 2.68 and the average family size was 3.30.

In the village, the population was spread out, with 31.2% under the age of 18, 9.9% from 18 to 24, 28.0% from 25 to 44, 20.4% from 45 to 64, and 10.5% who were 65 years of age or older.  The median age was 32 years. For every 100 females, there were 80.1 males.  For every 100 females age 18 and over, there were 85.0 males.

The median income for a household in the village was $29,583, and the median income for a family was $38,672. Males had a median income of $26,667 versus $20,568 for females. The per capita income for the village was $13,169.  About 13.1% of families and 19.1% of the population were below the poverty line, including 23.6% of those under age 18 and 25.8% of those age 65 or over.

Notable people 
 Barbara Crandall, Miss Michigan, 1984
 Maryann Krieglstein, social worker, professor, and college administrator at the College of DuPage; lived in Lawrence 
 Werner Krieglstein, professor at Western Michigan University, University of Chicago fellow and Fulbright Scholar; lived in Lawrence where he founded the Whole Arts Theater, which later moved to Kalamazoo
 James Toumey, pioneering educator at the Yale School of Forestry (now the Yale School of Forestry and Environmental Studies).
 Shayne Whittington, power forward for Indiana Pacers. Played for Lawrence Public schools. His jersey #32 was retired in 2014–2015.

References

External links 
 Village of Lawrence

Villages in Michigan
Villages in Van Buren County, Michigan
Kalamazoo–Portage metropolitan area